The Ferques Formation is a geologic formation in France. It preserves fossils dating back to the Devonian period.

See also 
 List of fossiliferous stratigraphic units in France

References 

Devonian France
Devonian southern paleotemperate deposits
Devonian southern paleotropical deposits